Dolichoderus burmanicus is a species of ant in the genus Dolichoderus. Described by Charles Thomas Bingham in 1903, the species is endemic to Myanmar.

References

Dolichoderus
Hymenoptera of Asia
Insects of Myanmar
Insects described in 1903